The 2012 season was the eighth for the  Rabobank Women Cycling Team cycling team, which began as the DSB Bank team in 2005.

Roster

Ages as of 1 January 2012.

Results

Season victories

Results in major races

Single day races

Grand Tours

UCI World Ranking

The team finished first in the UCI ranking for teams.

References

2012 UCI Women's Teams seasons
2012 in Dutch sport
2012 in women's road cycling
Rabo-Liv Women Cycling Team